Callionymus stigmatopareius, the Mozambique dragonet, is a species of dragonet only known from the Indian Ocean off of Mozambique.

References 

Endemic fauna of Mozambique
S
Fish described in 1981